Alonso Martínez may refer to:
 Alonso Martínez (footballer), Costa Rican footballer
 Alonso Martínez (Madrid Metro), a station of the Madrid Metro
 Alonso Martínez de Espinar, Spanish courtier